The women's discus throw athletics events for the 2016 Summer Paralympics take place at the Rio Olympic Stadium from 9 September. A total of 7 events are contested for 15 different classifications.

Medal summary

Competition format 
The competition for each classification consisted of a single round. Each athlete threw three times, after which the eight best threw three more times (with the best distance of the six throws counted).

Results

F11
The F11 event took place on 9 September.

F38
The F38 event took place on 14 September.

F41
The F41 event took place on 15 September.

F44
The F44 event took place on 11 September.

F52
The F52 event took place on 14 September.

F55
The F55 event took place on 17 September.

F57
The F57 event took place on 15 September. The event incorporates athletes from classification F56 in addition to F57.

References

Athletics at the 2016 Summer Paralympics